Four Seasons in Havana was a four-part 2016 Spanish-language web television series on Netflix. It is based on the books “The Havana Quartet” written by Cuban novelist  Leonardo Padura Fuentes. The premise revolves around lieutenant Mario Conde (Jorge Perugorría) and his partner Sgt. Manolo Palacios (Carlos Enrique Almirante), as they solve crime in the heart of Cuba’s capital Havana.

In November 2020, it was announced that the series will be leaving the streaming service on December 9 due to their expired 4-year contract with the show's production companies.

Cast
 Jorge Perugorría as Mario Conde
 Carlos Enrique Almirante as Palacios
 Luis Alberto García as Carlos El Flaco
 Mario Guerra as Candito El Rojo
 Enrique Molina as Antonio Rangel
 Jorge Martínez as Andrés
 Alexis Díaz as Conejoj
 Vladimir Cruz as Fabricio
 Néstor Jiménez as Forense
 Ernesto del Cañal as Crespo
 Saul Rojas as Greco
 Yudith Castillo as Vilma
 Laura Ramos as Tamara
 Aurora Basnuevo as Josefina
 Hector Pérez as Miki Cara de Jeba
 Yessica Borroto as Cuqui
 Felix Beatón as Capt. Cicerón
 Pilar Mayo as Maruchi
 Ylsi Pérez as Secretaria de Rangel

References

External links
 
 

Spanish-language television shows